R. orientalis  may refer to:
 Rhadinomyia orientalis, a picture-winged fly species
 Rhipilia orientalis, an alga species in the genus Rhipilia
 Rhynchelmis orientalis, a freshwater worm species found on Hokkaidō, Japan
 Rumex orientalis, a herb species

See also
 Orientalis (disambiguation)